The Avatar: The Last Airbender – Team Avatar Tales is a graphic novel anthology published by Dark Horse Comics collecting the 2013, 2014, and 2015 Free Comic Book Day stories and several original short stories created for this collection. It is part of Dark Horse Comics' continuation of the Avatar: The Last Airbender television series.

Stories

References

2019 graphic novels
Dark Horse Comics titles
Prequel comics
Sequel comics
Team Avatar Tales